The ADAC TCR Germany Touring Car Championship is a touring car racing series based in Germany.

History
On 16 September 2015, the German Series was launched by ADAC and Engstler Motorsport, who already run in the International Series. The new category runs in the same events as ADAC GT Masters and ADAC Formula 4 as well as Deutscher Tourenwagen Cup (formerly ADAC Procar) until the series was disbanded in 2016.

Champions

References

External links

TCR Series
Auto racing series in Germany
2015 establishments in Germany